Judy Thongori (born ) is a Kenyan lawyer and rights activist. She is a women's rights activist and she successfully sued the Kenyan government for not delivering 30% representation for women.

Life
Thongori was educated at Kahuhia Girls' High School for Ordinary Level (O-Level) and at The Kenya High School for Advanced Level (A-Level).

She graduated from the law school at the University of Nairobi and began an unchallenging job at the Attorney general's office. She left there to join Lee Muthoga and Associates where she felt purposed. She started to build up a private practice and a reputation as an advocate in company law.

She is married to another lawyer with whom she has two children.

She started her own law company and she became an advocate for women's rights. She saw that the Kenyan police turned a blind eye to abuse cases where the woman and family relied on the man's income. She realised that the culture was at fault. She organised training sessions for the police to inform their actions. Thongori spent five years leading an association of women lawyers. She was recognised by the Institute for Inclusive Security and  Thongori's highest profile case was when she won a case against the Kenyan government when they failed to deliver 30% representation for women.

In 2015 she was chosen to be one of 21 women who met for a conference at Harvard University Kennedy School of Government funded by Hunt Alternatives. The group included Fauzia Nasreen from Pakistan and Olufunke Baruwa, Esther Ibanga, Hafsat Abiola and Ayisha Osori from Nigeria.

References

Kenyan women's rights activists
21st-century Kenyan lawyers
Kenyan women lawyers
Alumni of Kenya High School
Living people
Year of birth missing (living people)